The Missa solemnis in C major, K. 66, is a mass composed by Wolfgang Amadeus Mozart in 1769. It is scored for SATB soloists and choir, violins I and II, viola, 2 oboes, 2 horns, 2 clarini (high trumpets), 2 trumpets and basso continuo.

Mozart composed the mass for the ordination of Cajetan Hagenauer, son of Lorenz Hagenauer, the Mozarts' landlord and family friend. Cajetan had entered St Peter's Abbey, a Benedictine monastery, whilst the Mozarts were on their grand tour. When he became a priest in 1769, he took the name Pater Dominicus and celebrated his first solemn high mass; this gives the work its nickname, Dominicusmesse. Leopold Mozart conducted the première on 15 October to a packed church in Salzburg; it is thought that the success of this performance led to Wolfgang's first Italian tour.

Due to its length, the mass is classified as a missa solemnis. It is divided into six movements.

 Kyrie Adagio, C major, 
 "Kyrie eleison" Allegro, C major, 
 Gloria Allegro moderato, C major, 
 "Laudamus te" Andante grazioso, F major, ; soprano/alto duet
 "Gratias agimus tibi" Adagio, C major, 
 "Propter magnam gloriam tuam" Allegro, C major, 
 "Domine Deus" Un poco andante, G major, ; tenor solo
 "Qui tollis peccata mundi" Un poco adagio, G minor, 
 "Quoniam tu" Andante ma un poco allegro, F major, ; soprano solo
 "Cum Sancto Spiritu" Alla breve, C major, 
 Credo Molto allegro, C major, 
 "Et incarnatus est" Adagio, F major, ; soloists
 "Crucifixus" Adagio, C minor, 
 "Et resurrexit" Molto allegro, C major, 
 "Et in Spiritum Sanctum Dominum" Andante, G major, ; soprano solo
 "Et in unam sanctam" Moderato, C major, 
 "Et vitam venturi saeculi" Allegro, C major, 
 Sanctus Adagio, C major, 
 "Pleni sunt coeli et terra" Allegro, C major, 
 "Hosanna in excelsis" Moderato, C major, 
 Benedictus Allegro moderato, G major, ; soloists
 "Hosanna in excelsis" Moderato, C major, 
 Agnus Dei Allegro moderato, C major, 
 "Dona nobis pacem" Allegro, C major,

Recordings

 1989 – Edith Mathis (soprano), Rosemarie Lang (contralto), Uwe Heilmann (tenor), Jan-Hendrik Rootering (bass) – Rundfunkchor Leipzig, Radio-Sinfonie-Orchester Leipzig, Herbert Kegel – CD Philips. This recording was used in Volume 19 (Missae/Requiem) of the Complete Mozart Edition. During the 1980s, Kegel recorded Mozart's complete large-scale religious music (i.e. masses, missae brevis, offertoriums etc.) for Philips.

References

External links
 
 
 

Masses by Wolfgang Amadeus Mozart
1769 compositions
Compositions in C major